St. Petersburg Catholic High School is a private, co-educational Roman Catholic high school in St. Petersburg, Florida. It is located in the Roman Catholic Diocese of Saint Petersburg. The campus was originally opened in February 1957 as Bishop Barry High School for boys. In 1973, Bishop Barry High School and the nearby Notre Dame Academy for girls merged to become St. Petersburg Catholic High School. (A decade earlier, St. Paul's High School for girls was merged into Notre Dame Academy.)

In July 1998, the Salesians of Don Bosco took over administration of the school. In March 2017, the Diocese of St. Petersburg announced that it would resume direct control through its Office of Catholic Schools and Centers.

Allegations of Racism
In January 2022, racist graffiti was found in a school restroom calling for the killing of all Black people, using a racial slur. The St. Petersburg Police Department investigated the matter, but the person or persons responsible were not identified. In addition to the racist graffiti, the word “monkey” was carved into a classroom door, and it was also asserted that racial bullying occurred at the school with the dean of students allegedly calling Black students “hoodlums”; some students addressing Black students as “slave” or the N-word; and some students exhibiting confederate flags on their cars.

The President of the St. Petersburg Branch of the NAACP requested to meet with the school’s principal about the matter. The NAACP and St. Petersburg Catholic High School alumnus and State Senator Darryl Rouson denounced the acts of racism, and the President of the Pinellas County Chapter of the Democratic Black Caucus of Florida and a Pinellas County Commissioner called for the removal of the school’s dean. However, no such action was taken by the school or the Roman Catholic Diocese of Saint Petersburg.

In April 2022, the Federal Bureau of Investigation and the United States Department of Justice contacted the St. Petersburg Chapter of the NAACP to host listening sessions to hear concerns about the safety of minority students at St. Petersburg Catholic High School and to present any accounts of racism to the office of the United States Attorney.

Notable alumni
 Chris Davis (wide receiver, born 1984), former professional football player
 Bill Freehan, Class of 1959, former professional baseball player for the Detroit Tigers
 John Kirby (admiral), Class of 1981, retired U.S. Navy rear admiral, assistant secretary of state for public affairs, deputy assistant secretary of defense for media operations
 Marty Lyons, Class of 1975, former professional football player for New York Jets and collegiate football player at University of Alabama
Darryl Rouson, Florida State Representative and State Senator
 Jock Sanders, Class of 2007, former professional football player – American football wide receiver; played for the West Virginia Mountaineers in college, was undrafted in the National Football League (NFL), and has played for several Canadian Football League (CFL) teams.

See also
Roman Catholic Diocese of Saint Petersburg
Salesians of Don Bosco
Clearwater Central Catholic High School
Tampa Catholic High School
Bishop McLaughlin Catholic High School

References

External links
 School Website
 School Facebook Page
 Alumni Facebook Page
 School Twitter Page
 School Instagram Page

Catholic secondary schools in Florida
Salesian secondary schools
High schools in Pinellas County, Florida
Education in St. Petersburg, Florida
Roman Catholic Diocese of Saint Petersburg
1957 establishments in Florida
Educational institutions established in 1957